Cibikli or Dzhibikli may refer to:
Aşağı Cibikli, Azerbaijan
Yuxarı Cibikli, Azerbaijan